In Greek mythology, Aganippe (Ancient Greek: Ἀγανίππη means 'mare who kills mercifully') was the name of both a spring and the Naiad (a Crinaea) associated with it. The spring is in Boeotia, near Thespiae, at the base of Mount Helicon, and was associated with the Muses who were sometimes called Aganippides. Drinking from her well, it was considered to be a source of poetic inspiration. The nymph is called a daughter of the river-god Permessus (called Termessus by Pausanias). Ovid associates Aganippe with Hippocrene.

Notes

References 

Bell, Robert E., Women of Classical Mythology: A Biographical Dictionary. ABC-Clio. 1991. .
Graves, Robert, The Greek Myths, Harmondsworth, London, England, Penguin Books, 1960. 
Graves, Robert, The Greek Myths: The Complete and Definitive Edition. Penguin Books Limited. 2017. 
Pliny the Elder, The Natural History. John Bostock, M.D., F.R.S. H.T. Riley, Esq., B.A. London. Taylor and Francis, Red Lion Court, Fleet Street. 1855. Online version at the Perseus Digital Library.
Publius Ovidius Naso, Fasti translated by James G. Frazer. Online version at the Topos Text Project.
Publius Ovidius Naso, Fasti. Sir James George Frazer. London; Cambridge, MA. William Heinemann Ltd.; Harvard University Press. 1933. Latin text available at the Perseus Digital Library.
Publius Vergilius Maro, Eclogues. J. B. Greenough. Boston. Ginn & Co. 1895. Online version at the Perseus Digital Library.
Publius Vergilius Maro, Bucolics, Aeneid, and Georgics of Vergil. J. B. Greenough. Boston. Ginn & Co. 1900. Latin text available at the Perseus Digital Library.
Smith, William; Dictionary of Greek and Roman Biography and Mythology, London (1873). Aganippe 1

Naiads
Children of Potamoi
Locations in Greek mythology